The 2018–19 Gibraltar Intermediate League is the first season of under-23 football in Gibraltar, after reforms to reserve team football in June 2018. The league is expected to be contested by ten clubs, and began on 21 August 2018 despite initially being set to begin on 13 August.

Format
The Gibraltar Intermediate League was established by the Gibraltar Football Association in June 2018 as a merger of the pre-existing Reserves Division and Under 18 Division, in order to aid player development on the territory. Competing clubs are required to register a reserve squad of 18 players, of which 13 must be Gibraltarian.

Teams

The following teams were registered by the Gibraltar Football Association to compete. However, Gibraltar United withdrew from the league on the eve of their first game, citing a lack of players. St Joseph's resigned in December 2018 ahead of their Gibraltar Intermediate Cup tie against Gibraltar Phoenix.

Note: Flags indicate national team as has been defined under FIFA eligibility rules. Players may hold more than one non-FIFA nationality.

Managerial Changes

League table

Season statistics

Scoring

Top scorers

Hat-tricks

Clean Sheets

1:Bradley Banda kept 3 clean sheets for Glacis United before transferring to Lynx.

See also
2018–19 Gibraltar Premier Division
2018–19 Gibraltar Second Division

References

Intermediate